Rannaghar was a Bengali language cooking show which aired on Zee Bangla. The show was hosted by Sudipa Chatterjee.
 
This show is the largest cooking show in Asia. After a successful journey of 17 and a half years, it went off-air on 31 December 2022 and got replaced by Ghore Ghore Zee Bangla which premiered on 2 January 2023.  

Some episodes had been hosted by other personalities, including Sonali Chowdhury, Sneha Chatterjee Bhowmik, Ushasi Ray and Manali Dey. Now, Some episodes of some occasions have been hosted by Ushashi Ray, Geetasri Roy. It premiered in the year 2005, making it the longest-running Bengali television series till date. It is the third longest-running Indian television series. The series celebrated its 16th Anniversary on 9 May 2022. Ushasi Ray first host the series on Pohela Boishakh Special Episode 2021 from Last of June 2021, Ushasi is hosting more episodes than Sudipa. From 24 January 2022, actress Tiyasha Roy started hosting special episodes of this show. In Rathyatra 2022, actress Sriparna Roy hosted 3 few episodes titled as "Rathyatra Special".

Guest appearances
Many eminent figures of Bengal including Sourav Ganguly, Raja Narayan Deb, Srabanti Chatterjee, Tanusree Chakraborty, Koel Mallick,  Usha Uthup, Rachana Banerjee, Subhashree Ganguly, Adrit Roy, Rukmini Maitra, Nusrat Jahan, Supriya Devi, Sabitri Chatterjee and many others have appeared in the show.

References

External links 
 Rannaghor at ZEE5

Bengali-language television programming in India
Indian cooking television series
Zee Bangla original programming